The Castle Hill Avenue station is a local station on the IRT Pelham Line of the New York City Subway. Located at the intersection of Castle Hill and Westchester Avenues in the Castle Hill neighborhood in the Bronx, it is served by the 6 train at all times except weekdays in the peak direction, when the <6> train takes over.


Station layout

This elevated station has three tracks and two side platforms. The center track is not used in regular service. It resembles other elevated stations along the line, with wood mezzanines and no windscreens along the platform edges.

The station is located north of the Castle Hill neighborhood, and the street that the station is named for leads to that neighborhood.

From October 5, 2013 to May 4, 2014, the station was closed for rehabilitation work.

Exits
The station's only exit is a mezzanine beneath the tracks. Outside fare control, stairs lead to the northeast and southwest corners of Westchester Avenue and Castle Hill Avenue.

References

External links 

 
 Station Reporter — 6 Train
 The Subway Nut — Castle Hill Avenue Pictures 
 Castle Hill Avenue entrance from Google Maps Street View
 Platforms from Google Maps Street View

IRT Pelham Line stations
New York City Subway stations in the Bronx
Railway stations in the United States opened in 1920
1920 establishments in New York City